Rybinsky (masculine), Rybinskaya (feminine), or Rybinskoye (neuter) is the name of several rural localities in Russia:

Rybinsky, Oryol Oblast, a settlement in Medvedkovsky Selsoviet of Bolkhovsky District of Oryol Oblast
Rybinsky, Rostov Oblast, a khutor in Kalininskoye Rural Settlement of Sholokhovsky District of Rostov Oblast